Gloster is a town in central Amite County, Mississippi, United States. The population was 897 at the 2020 census.

History
Gloster was incorporated on March 11, 1884.

It was largely founded as a railroad town. Gloster was named after the engineer who put the Yazoo and Mississippi Valley R.R. through in the 1880s.

The facility was expected to create 45 jobs, and is called Amite BioEnergy.

Economic revival 
Governor Tate Reeves of Mississippi came down to Gloster to announce Claw Forestry Services will build a $200 million sawmill on about 50 acres comprising the former Georgia-Pacific mill site and the adjoining former elementary school property. The elementary school has been closed for many years. Mayor Jerry Norwood said the announcement is "one of the proudest moments in my life, and my proudest moment as mayor." 

William VanDevender, chief executive officer of Claw, said once the plant is up and running, it should produce about 250 million board-feet of lumber a year, using about 1 million tons of logs annually, and make sales of more than $100 million a year. VanDevender and other Claw officials "recognize the quality of the workforce and the quality of the timber basket in Southwest Mississippi," Reeves said after the presentation. "This will benefit not just the 130 families that have workers at the plant, but boost timber owners across a four to five-county region."

Governor Reeves said, "he expects Southwest Mississippi Community College will play a large role in providing training for employees at the plant.

Gloster Forestry announced: "In connection with the new sawmill facility, efforts are underway to resume operation of the Gloster Southern Railroad to further revitalize industry and jobs in the underserved community."

Demographics

Population
According to the 2020 census, there were 897 people in Gloster. As of the census of 2010, there were 960 people, 223 households, and 114 families residing in the town.

Race 

In 2010, the racial makeup of the town was 54.99% African American, 44.18% White, 0.56% from other races, and 0.28% from two or more races. Hispanic or Latino of any race were 1.77% of the population. In 2020, the racial makeup was 70.57% African American, 25.64% non-Hispanic white, 0.33% Native American, 1.56% other or mixed, and 1.78% Hispanic or Latino of any race.

Education
It is in the Amite County School District.

Notable people

See also

 List of towns in Mississippi

References

External links

 Gloster website

1884 establishments in Mississippi
populated places established in 1884
towns in Amite County, Mississippi
towns in McComb micropolitan area
towns in Mississippi